Indrapuri Barrage (also known as the Sone Barrage) is across the Son River in Rohtas district in the Indian state of Bihar.

The Barrage
It was constructed by Hindustan Construction Company (HCC),the company which constructed the 2,253 m long Farakka Barrage, the longest in the world. Construction of the barrage was taken up in the 1960s and it was commissioned in 1968.

The Canal System
In 1873–74, one of the oldest irrigation systems in the country was developed with an anicut across the Son at Dehri. Water from the Son fed canal systems on both sides of the river and irrigated large areas.  A barrage was constructed 8 km upstream of the anicut. Two link canals connected the new reservoir to the old irrigation system and also extended it.

Sir John Houlton, the veteran British administrator, described (in 1949) the Son canal system as follows, "This is easily the largest canal system in Bihar; there are 209 miles of main canals, 149 of branch canals and 1,235 of distributaries… The canals are of enormous benefit to cultivation. They have converted a large area of infertile land into a richly productive area."

Future plans
There is a proposal for the construction of a dam across the Son, between Kadwan in Garhwa district of Jharkhand and Matiwan in Rohtas district of Bihar.

As per the National River Linking Project of the National Water Development Agency, there is a proposal for linking the Ganges with the Son, through the 149.10 km Chunar-Sone Barrage Link Canal. The canal will start from the right side of the Ganges near Chunar tehsil of Mirzapur district in UP and would link to the Indrapuri barrage. There would be three lifts at three places on the route. The lifts would be of 38.8 m, 16.10 m and 4.4 m.

References

Tourist attractions in Rohtas district
Dams in Bihar
Dams completed in 1968
Dams on the Son River
1968 establishments in Bihar
Canals in Bihar
20th-century architecture in India